Salaš is a village in the municipality of Zaječar, Serbia. According to the 2002 census, the village has a population of 962 people.

History
From 1929 to 1941, Salaš was part of the Morava Banovina of the Kingdom of Yugoslavia.

References

Populated places in Zaječar District